Circo Voador (Portuguese for Flying Circus) is a concert venue in Rio de Janeiro, Brazil. Located adjacent to the Carioca Aqueduct in the Lapa neighborhood, it is a large tent-like structure covering the stage and spectator areas, but with open sides. It has weekly concerts by Brazilian bands and artists, with occasional appearances by foreign artists or theme parties. Circo Voador began in Arpoador, the peninsula between Ipanema and Copacabana, when local artists erected a circus tent to display their work. The city eventually granted the land where the venue currently sits as a permanent home.

See also 
 Live at Circo Voador by Hoobastank, 2004

References

External links 

 

Music venues in Rio de Janeiro (city)